{{Short description|Relative of Emperor Menelik II and Darge Sahle Selassie of Ethiopia}}Tesseme Darge' was the daughter of Ras Darge Sahle Selassie, Prince of Selale, and granddaughter of Sahle Selassie, King of Shewa in the Ethiopian Empire.  She was a first cousin to Emperor Menelik II.

As part of the agreement by Menelik (then King of Shewa) and Wagshum Gobeze Gebre Medhin, Menelik recognized the Wagshum as Emperor Tekle Giyorgis II, and in return Tesseme Darge was given in marriage to Tekle Giyorgis' half-brother Haile Wolde Kiros of Lasta. Woizero Tesseme and Haile had a son, Ras Kassa Haile Darge, who succeeded Ras Darge as head of the Selale branch of the dynasty, and later became President of the Crown Council under Emperor Haile Selassie. Her second marriage was to Bitwoded (title) Wolde-Tsadik Goshu, First Mayor of Addis Ababa, President of the first Ministers Council as well as Chief Executive of the provisional government of Ethiopia (under the Prince Regent Ras Imiru Haile Selassie) during Emperor Haile-Selassie's exile. By whom she had one son Dejazmatch'' (title) Teferi Wolde-Tsadik.

References

Ethiopian Royal Family
Ethiopian princesses